Stand Out may refer to:
 Stand Out, 2008 live album by Tye Tribbett
 A track from the album above
 "Stand Out", a 1995 song by Tevin Campbell from A Goofy Movie
 "Stand Out", a 2005 song by the Bratz Rock Angelz from Rock Angelz
 "Stand Out", a 2014 song by Sabrina Carpenter from How to Build a Better Boy